André Tubeuf (18 December 1930 – 26 July 2021) was a French writer, philosopher, and music critic.

Biography

Training
Tubeuf was born in Smyrna (today İzmir), Turkey. A condisciple in Beirut, Lebanon, France, of Salah Stétié and Robert Abirached, Tubeuf came to Paris, France, after the war and performed his khâgne at the lycee Louis-le-Grand, where he joined Dominique Fernandez, Michel Deguy, Jacques Derrida and his cousin Pierre-Jean Rémy.

In 1950, Tubeuf was received at the École normale supérieure, rue d'Ulm, where he first followed the teaching of Michel Alexandre (himself a pupil of Alain), then that of Louis Althusser and Maurice Merleau-Ponty, and became friends with Gérard Granel.

In 1951, with Maurice Clavel, Tubeuf translated Electra by Sophocles for Silvia Monfort.

An agrégé in philosophy, Tubeuf taught this subject in philosophy class and then in Classes préparatoires littéraires (khâgne) at the lycée Fustel-de-Coulanges in Strasbourg, from 1957 to 1992.

In 1972, he joined the Ministry of Culture in the cabinet of Jacques Duhamel, to deal with musical matters; he pursued this experience in 1975 in the office of Michel Guy.

Writer
From 1976, Tubeuf mainly collaborated with the magazine Le Point, but also at Avant Scène Opéra, Harmonie and Lyrica, then Diapason and finally Classica. In addition, he was a regular lecturer, such as at the Salzburg Festival, and radio broadcaster.

After Romain Rolland, André Suarès and Vladimir Jankélévitch, of whom he was the pupil, he renewed the genre of musical literature in France, escaping the novelistic genre, without falling into musicology.

In addition to his essays on Mozart, Ludwig van Beethoven, Richard Wagner, Giuseppe Verdi, Richard Strauss and the lied, Tubeuf wrote profiles of Elisabeth Schwarzkopf, Dietrich Fischer-Dieskau, Claudio Arrau, Hans Hotter, Rudolf Serkin, Arthur Rubinstein, Régine Crespin, Daniel Barenboim, Hélène Grimaud and Cecilia Bartoli.

Honours
 Commandeur of the National Order of Merit (2009).

Bibliography
1979: Le Chant retrouvé, Fayard
1993: 
1987: Les Enfants dissipés, novel, Gallimard
1993: Wagner, le chant des images, "L'opéra des images", Éditions du Chêne
1999: La Callas, "Mémoire des Stars", Pierre Assouline publisher
2000: Damiel ou les Indifférents, novel, Albin Michel
2003: Appassionata (portrait of pianist Claudio Arrau)
2004: Richard Strauss ou le Voyageur et son ombre, biography, "Classica", Actes Sud
2004: Les Autres Soirs, with Elisabeth Schwarzkopf, Éditions Tallandier
2005: Mozart, chemins et chant, biography, "Classica", Actes Sud
2005: Divas, book with CD, Assouline
2007: L'Offrande musicale, portraits an essays, "Bouquins", Éditions Robert Laffont
2008: La Quatorzième Valse, novel, "Classica", Actes Sud
2008: Les Amours du poète, La Pionnière
2009: Beethoven, biography, "Classica", Actes Sud, prix de l'essai of the Académie française. 
2010: Verdi, de vive voix, biography, "Classica", Actes Sud
2010: Hommage à Régine Crespin, with Christophe Ghristi, Actes Sud/Opéra de Paris
2010: L'Opéra de Vienne, Actes Sud
2011: Les Ballets russes, Assouline
2011: Le Lied, Actes Sud
2012: Dictionnaire amoureux de la musique, Plon
2013: Je crois entendre encore…, Plon
2014: Hommages, Actes Sud
2016: L'Orient derrière soi, Actes Sud

References

External links
 Selection of articles by André Tubeuf
 André Tubeuf connaît son classique on Télérama (23 July 2016)
 André Tubeuf at Actes Sud
 André Tubeuf on France Inter
 André Tubeuf on Babelio
 André Tubeuf et l'écho lointain de l'Orient on L'Express (4 December 2016)
 « André Tubeuf : Mémoire » by André Tubeuf and Lionel Esparza, France Musique, July 2016 (4 programs)
 Discography on Discogs
 Lecthot - Interview d'André Tubeuf - L'Orient derrière soi on YouTube 

1930 births
2021 deaths
People from İzmir
20th-century French novelists
21st-century French novelists
20th-century French philosophers
21st-century French philosophers
20th-century French essayists
21st-century French essayists
20th-century French musicologists
21st-century French musicologists
Classical music critics
French biographers
École Normale Supérieure alumni
Commanders of the Ordre national du Mérite